Macnelly Torres Berrío (born 1 November 1984) is a former Colombian footballer former professional footballer who played mainly as an attacking midfielder. A playmaker and known for his technical abilities with the ball he was able to win 16 titles during his 18 years of career.

Torres made his debut for Colombia in 2007 and has scored 4 goals in 48 appearances for the country.

Club career

Early career
Torres joined Atlético Junior's youth system at age 10 until he made his debut as a professional in 2002. In the 2004 season Junior won the Finalización Tournament, which was his first professional title in his career. Macnelly was part of a "golden generation" for Junior, also including players like Martín Arzuaga and Omar Sebastián Pérez.

In 2005, he moved to Cúcuta Deportivo, where he won the 2006 Finalización. He also participated in the 2007 Copa Libertadores, where he scored a goal against Uruguay's Nacional to help Cúcuta qualify for the semifinals, which they lost to the eventual champions Boca Juniors.

Colo-Colo
After Jesús Dátolo of Boca Juniors failed to sign for Chilean club Colo-Colo, Torres became the new target of the Santiago-based club. He completed his move after long negotiations of the Chilean club with Cúcuta, and both clubs reached an agreement for a fee of US$2.4 million. This fee was the most expensive in Chilean football history at the time. The previous record was the $1.2 million transfer of Néstor Gorosito from San Lorenzo de Almagro to Universidad Católica. On 7 February 2008, Torres was presented as new player of the club during a press conference alongside the club's coach Claudio Borghi.

He arrived as a replacement for his compatriot Giovanni Hernández, who had problems with the club's board and then signed for Atlético Junior. Colo-Colo later confirmed that Torres would join in June, because he had to finish playing the 2008 Copa Libertadores with Cúcuta. Torres won two league titles with the club: the 2008 Clausura and the 2009 Clausura.

In January 2011, Torres requested to leave the club.

Atlético Nacional
In 2011, he moved back to his home country and signed for Atlético Nacional. With the club, he won the 2011 and 2013 Apertura, as well as the 2012 Copa Colombia. He also a brief loan spell after the 2011 Apertura to San Luis of the Liga MX.

Al Shabab
Shortly after winning the 2013 Apertura title with Nacional, Torres moved to the Middle East and signed with Saudi Arabian club Al Shabab for a fee of $4.5 million. He played one season with the Saudi club, where he scored once in 22 league appearances. He left the club in a controversial way, after sending a complaint to FIFA because he was denied his salary payment for five months.

Return to Junior
Torres returned to Junior in 2015, which was the club where he made his professional debut in 2001. He played the Apertura season with the club, which runs from January to June, while making 19 appearances and scoring 2 goals.

Return to Atletico Nacional

In June 2015, Torres returned to Nacional and signed a three-year contract with the club. In December 2015, he won his first title  with the club, the 2015 Finalizacion. He won the 2016 Copa Libertadores with Nacional, and scored an important goal against Rosario Central in the quarter-finals, while being named in the squad of the tournament. He added two more titles in 2017: the Recopa Sudamericana in April, and the 2017 Apertura title in June.

Deportivo Cali 
In July 2018, Torres signed for Deportivo Cali, and played the 2018 Finalización season with them.

Libertad
In December 2018, a Club Libertad director commented that the club's coach, Leonel Alvarez, who is also Colombian just like Torres, wanted to bring the player to the club. A few days later, the transfer was confirmed and Torres signed for the Paraguayan club on a two-year contract. In addition, a release clause of $500,000 was set. He joined fellow Colombian Alexander Mejía at the club, who was his former teammate at Atlético Nacional. He won the 2019 Copa Paraguay with the club. In January 2020, the club decided to terminate his contract, mainly due to the number of injuries he had and performing below the expectations.

Alianza Petrolera 
In February 2020, the Colombian player returned to his home country, this time to Alianza Petrolera. In December 2020 he left the club, citing injuries and COVID-19 as the reasons.

International career
Torres was part of the Colombia U-20 squad that reached the semi-finals of the 2003 FIFA World Youth Championship. He played 5 games. 

Torres made his international debut in a friendly against Guatemala on 17 June 2005. Torres also played in all of Colombia's group games at the 2007 Copa America.

His decision to make the move to Saudi Arabia was publicly criticized by former Colombian midfielder Carlos Valderrama, as it was considered to be the reason why he wasn't selected for the 2014 World Cup squad. Despite not being selected, he was still called up to dispute the 2014 World Cup qualifying matches against Ecuador and Uruguay in September, as well as Colombia's last two matches against Chile and Paraguay, all while playing for Al-Shabab.

Personal life
Torres' first name, Macnelly, was given to him by his father after a baseball star he admired.

Career statistics

Club

1 Includes cup competitions such as Copa Libertadores and Copa Sudamericana.

2 Includes Superliga Colombiana matches.

International goals
Scores and results lists Colombia's goal tally first.

Honours

Club
Atlético Junior
 Categoría Primera A (1): 2004 Finalización

Cúcuta Deportivo
 Categoría Primera A (1): 2006 Finalización

Colo-Colo
 Primera División de Chile (2): 2008 Clausura, 2009 Clausura

Atlético Nacional
 Categoría Primera A (4): 2011 Apertura, 2013 Apertura, 2015 Clausura, 2017 Apertura
 Copa Colombia (2): 2012, 2016
 Superliga Colombiana (1): 2012
 Copa Libertadores (1): 2016
 Recopa Sudamericana (1): 2017

Al-Shabab Riyadh
 King Cup of Champions (1): 2014

Club Libertad 

 Copa Paraguay: 2019

References

External links
 
 

1984 births
Living people
Sportspeople from Barranquilla
Association football midfielders
Colombian footballers
Colombian expatriate footballers
Colombia under-20 international footballers
Colombia international footballers
2005 CONCACAF Gold Cup players
2007 Copa América players
Atlético Junior footballers
Cúcuta Deportivo footballers
Colo-Colo footballers
Atlético Nacional footballers
San Luis F.C. players
Al-Shabab FC (Riyadh) players
Club Libertad footballers
Deportivo Cali footballers
Alianza Petrolera players
Categoría Primera A players
Chilean Primera División players
Liga MX players
Saudi Professional League players
Paraguayan Primera División players
Expatriate footballers in Chile
Expatriate footballers in Mexico
Expatriate footballers in Saudi Arabia
Expatriate footballers in Paraguay
Colombian expatriate sportspeople in Chile
Colombian expatriate sportspeople in Mexico
Colombian expatriate sportspeople in Saudi Arabia
Colombian expatriate sportspeople in Paraguay